Hussain Mohamed Hassan can refer to:

 Hussain Mohamed Hassan (field hockey) (born 1971), Egyptian field hockey player
 Hussain Mohamed Hassan (judoka) (born 1970), Kuwaiti judoka